Amber Jacobs (born June 29, 1982) is a former professional basketball player in the Women's National Basketball Association (WNBA), for the Los Angeles Sparks. She then became the assistant athletic director for Clarks Summit University and their head women's basketball coach. Prior to that, Jacobs was an assistant coach at the University of Rhode Island women's basketball team under her former head coach at Boston College Cathy Inglese.

After attending Abington Heights High School in Clarks Summit, Pennsylvania, Jacobs attended college at Boston College and graduated in 2004.  Following her collegiate career, she was selected as the 33rd overall pick in the 2004 WNBA Draft.

Primarily as reserve in her first two seasons, Jacobs averaged 3.4 points and 1.8 assists per game.  She became Lynx starting point guard in 2006 and averaged 8.2 points and 3.4 assists per game.

With the acquisitions of rookies Lindsey Harding and Noelle Quinn, Jacobs returned to a reserve role in 2007.  She appeared in 29 games, averaging 3.2 points and 1.4 assists in 11.3 minutes per game.

During the WNBA offseason, Jacobs has served as an assistant coach with the University of Toledo women's basketball team for two years. She then spent a season in Ribera, Italy playing in the Italian League. During the off-season 2007–2008, Jacobs was a personal trainer in Florida.
On March 17, 2008,  the Washington Mystics signed Jacobs when the Minnesota Lynx did not match the offer sheet. On June 23, 2008, Jacobs was waived by the Washington Mystics. She was then signed by the Los Angeles Sparks July 7, 2008. On July 29, 2008, Jacobs was waived by the Los Angeles Sparks.

On June 1, 2010, she was announced as the Head Women's Basketball Coach at Clarks Summit University in Clarks Summit, Pennsylvania.

In 2016, Jacobs was selected by Boston College to be their representative to the 12th Annual Class of "ACC Women's Basketball Legends."

WNBA career statistics

Regular season

|-
| align="left" | 2004
| align="left" | Minnesota
| 32 || 0 || 12.2 || .310 || .317 || .909 || 1.1 || 1.5 || 0.4 || 0.0 || 1.4 || 3.2
|-
| align="left" | 2005
| align="left" | Minnesota
| 33 || 0 || 14.5 || .385 || .377 || .724 || 0.6 || 2.1 || 0.6 || 0.1 || 1.4 || 3.7
|-
| align="left" | 2006
| align="left" | Minnesota
| 34 || 34 || 25.3 || .449 || .392 || .825 || 2.6 || 3.4 || 0.8 || 0.1 || 2.6 || 8.2
|-
| align="left" | 2007
| align="left" | Minnesota
| 29 || 0 || 11.3 || .333 || .262 || .615 || 0.7 || 1.4 || 0.3 || 0.0 || 1.4 || 3.2
|-
| align="left" | 2008
| align="left" | Washington
| 6 || 3 || 13.7 || .250 || .300 || .500 || 1.2 || 1.8 || 0.5 || 0.0 || 1.3 || 1.7
|-
| align="left" | 2008
| align="left" | Los Angeles
| 5 || 0 || 12.2 || .273 || .400 || 1.000 || 0.4 || 1.2 || 0.0 || 0.0 || 1.6 || 2.0
|-
| align="left" | Career
| align="left" | 5 years, 3 teams
| 139 || 37 || 15.8 || .381 || .324 || .792 || 1.3 || 2.1 || 0.5 || 0.0 || 1.7 || 4.4

Playoffs

|-
| align="left" | 2004
| align="left" | Minnesota
| 2 || 0 || 18.0 || .600 || .500 || .500 || 0.5 || 1.0 || 0.0 || 0.0 || 2.0 || 4.0
|-
| align="left" | Career
| align="left" | 1 year, 1 team
| 2 || 0 || 18.0 || .600 || .500 || .500 || 0.5 || 1.0 || 0.0 || 0.0 || 2.0 || 4.0

Boston College statistics

Source

References

External links 
WNBA player profile
2004 WNBA rookie prospect profile
Article on Jacobs' high school jersey being retired
University of Toledo coaching profile
Mystics signs Jacobs
Mystics waived Jacobs
Sparks signs Jacobs
Sparks waived Jacobs

1982 births
Living people
American women's basketball coaches
American women's basketball players
Basketball players from Indiana
Boston College Eagles women's basketball players
Los Angeles Sparks players
Minnesota Lynx draft picks
Minnesota Lynx players
People from Clarks Summit, Pennsylvania
Point guards
Washington Mystics players